Ma petite entreprise (English: My Little Business) is a 1999 French film directed by Pierre Jolivet and written by Jolivet and Simon Michaël.

Cast 
 Vincent Lindon : Ivan Lansi
 François Berléand : Maxime Nassieff
 Roschdy Zem : Sami
 Zabou Breitman : Nathalie
 Albert Dray : Charles
 Catherine Mouchet : Lucie
 Françoise Sage : Catherine
 Pascal Leguennec : Louis
 Catherine Davenier : Marthe
 Yoann Denaive : Christophe Lansi
 Lokman Nalcakan : Ludo
 Anne Le Ny : Madame Chastaing

Awards and nominations 
César Awards (France)
Won: Best Actor – Supporting Role (François Berléand)
Nominated: Best Actor – Leading Role (Vincent Lindon)
Nominated: Best Actor – Supporting Role (Roschdy Zem)
Nominated: Best Actress – Supporting Role (Catherine Mouchet)
Nominated: Best Writing (Pierre Jolivet and Simon Michaël)
Étoiles d'Or (France)
Won: Best Film (Pierre Jolivet)
Montréal World Film Festival (Canada)
Won: Best Screenplay (Pierre Jolivet and Simon Michaël)
Nominated: Grand Prix des Amériques (Pierre Jolivet)

References

External links
 

1999 films
French comedy-drama films
1990s French-language films
Films featuring a Best Supporting Actor César Award-winning performance
Films directed by Pierre Jolivet
1990s French films